The women's 800 metres at the 2011 Asian Athletics Championships was held at the Kobe Universiade Memorial Stadium on 10 July.

Results

References
Results

800 metres
800 metres at the Asian Athletics Championships
2011 in women's athletics